The Gulf of Trieste is a very shallow bay of the Adriatic Sea, in the extreme northern part of the Adriatic Sea. It is part of the Gulf of Venice and is shared by Italy, Slovenia and Croatia. It is closed to the south by the peninsula of Istria, the largest peninsula in the Adriatic Sea, shared between Croatia and Slovenia. The entire Slovenian sea is part of the Gulf of Trieste.

Overview
The gulf is limited by an imaginary line connecting the Punta Tagliamento on the Italian and Savudrija (Punta Salvore) on the Croatian coast. With the exception of flat islets blocking the entrance to Marano-Grado lagoon, there are no islands in the gulf. Its eastern coasts, with Trieste and the Slovenian Littoral, have more rugged relief.

The sea current in the gulf flows counterclockwise. Its average speed is 0.8 knots. Tides in the gulf are among the largest in the Adriatic Sea, but nevertheless do not usually exceed . The average salinity is 37–38‰, but in the summer it falls below 35‰.

Its most prominent features are:
 The Bay of Panzano in Italy
 The Bay of Muggia in Italy
 The Bay of Grignano in Italy
 The Bay of Koper in Slovenia
 The Gulf of Piran, the sovereignty over which has been a matter of dispute between Croatia and Slovenia since 1991.

The entire Slovenian coastline is located on the Gulf of Trieste. Towns along the coastline include (from east to west) Koper, Izola, and Piran.

See also 
 Slovenian Riviera
 Free Territory of Trieste
 Treaty of Osimo
 Barcolana regatta

References

External links
 
 Gulf of Trieste on Geopedia.si  (map, relief, orthophoto)
 Conditions in the Gulf of Trieste on and near the Slovene coast:
 Koper - graphs, in the following order, of water level and temperature data for the past 30 days (taken in Koper by ARSO)
 Piran - graphs, in the following order, of water temperature, wave height, wave (interval) period, wave direction, current speed, current direction, maximum wave height data for the past 30 days (taken near Piran by ARSO)

Gulfs of Italy
Gulfs of the Mediterranean
Gulfs of Croatia
Gulfs of Slovenia
Geography of Trieste
Croatia–Slovenia border
Italy–Slovenia border
Bays of the Adriatic Sea